
Gmina Witkowo is an urban-rural gmina (administrative district) in Gniezno County, Greater Poland Voivodeship, in west-central Poland.

Villages
Apart from the town of Witkowo, Gmina Witkowo contains the villages and settlements of Ćwierdzin, Czajki, Dębina, Folwark, Gaj, Głożyny, Gorzykowo, Jaworowo, Kamionka, Kołaczkowo, Królewiec, Krzyżówka, Mąkownica, Małachowo-Kępe, Małachowo-Szemborowice, Małachowo-Wierzbiczany, Małachowo-Złych Miejsc, Malenin, Mielżyn, Odrowąż, Ostrowite Prymasowskie, Piaski, Popielarze, Raszewo, Ruchocin, Ruchocinek, Skorzęcin, Skorzęcin-Nadleśnictwo, Sokołowo, Stary Dwór, Strzyżewo Witkowskie, Wiekowo, Wierzchowiska and Witkówko.

Neighbouring gminas
Gmina Witkowo is bordered by the gminas of Gniezno, Niechanowo, Orchowo, Powidz, Strzałkowo, Trzemeszno and Września.

References
Polish official population figures 2006

Witkowo
Gniezno County